The second season of South Park, an American animated television series created by Trey Parker and Matt Stone, began airing on April 1, 1998. The second season concluded after 18 episodes on January 20, 1999; it remains the longest season of South Park to date. Almost all the episodes were directed by series co-creator Trey Parker, with the exception of two episodes directed by Eric Stough.

Broadcast
The first season of the show concluded with the episode "Cartman's Mom Is a Dirty Slut", broadcast on Comedy Central in the United States on February 25, 1998, and had a cliffhanger ending regarding the identity of Cartman's father. The episode scheduled for April 1, 1998 promised to resolve the mystery, but was in fact an April Fools' Day joke on the creator's part: "Terrance and Phillip in Not Without My Anus", an entire episode revolving around the two title characters. The April 1 episode was supposed to be a one-off, with the rest of the season starting in May. However, following overwhelmingly negative fan reaction, the episode resolving the Cartman's father storyline, "Cartman's Mom Is Still a Dirty Slut", was moved from its planned May 20 air date to April 22. "Ike's Wee Wee" then started a six-episode weekly run of the season when it was broadcast on May 20.

The show went on a summer break of a month and a half, and returned for another six-episode run on August 19, with the episode "Chef's Chocolate Salty Balls". The next installment came after a three-week break, with the Halloween episode "Spookyfish", which aired on October 28. The next two episodes were "Merry Christmas, Charlie Manson!" and "Gnomes", airing on December 9 and 16 respectively. The final episode of the season, "Prehistoric Ice Man" aired after five weeks of hiatus, on January 20, 1999. The third season then started a few months later, in April 1999.

Voice cast

Main cast
 Trey Parker as Stan Marsh, Eric Cartman, Randy Marsh, Mr. Garrison, Clyde Donovan, Mr. Hankey, Mr. Mackey, Stephen Stotch, Jimmy Valmer, Tolkien Black, Timmy Burch and Phillip
 Matt Stone as Kyle Broflovski, Kenny McCormick, Butters Stotch, Gerald Broflovski, Stuart McCormick, Pip Pirrup, Craig Tucker, Jimbo Kern, Terrance, Tweek Tweak and Jesus
 Mary Kay Bergman as Liane Cartman, Sheila Broflovski, Shelly Marsh, Sharon Marsh, Mrs. McCormick and Wendy Testaburger
 Isaac Hayes as Chef

Guest cast
 Henry Winkler as the Kid-Eating Monster ("City on the Edge of Forever")
 Jay Leno as himself ("City on the Edge of Forever")
 Brent Musburger as Scuzzlebutt's leg ("City on the Edge of Forever")
 Jonathan Katz as Dr. Katz ("Summer Sucks")
 Dian Bachar as the Cow Days' announcer ("Cow Days")
Multiple musicians and bands made guest appearances in the episode "Chef Aid". These include:
 Devo
 DMX
 Rick James
 Elton John
 Meat Loaf
 Ozzy Osbourne
 Primus
 Rancid
 Joe Strummer
 Ween

Episodes

Home media
Special Features
 Introductions by Trey Parker and Matt Stone in 12 episodes.
 Documentary: "Goin' Down to South Park"
 "Chocolate Salty Balls" music video
 Region 1 – June 3, 2003
 Region 2 – October 22, 2007
 Region 4 –  October 4, 2007

References

External links

 South Park Studios – official website with streaming video of full episodes.
 The Comedy Network – full episodes for Canada

 
1998 American television seasons
1999 American television seasons